Helicella orzai is a species of land snail in the family Geomitridae, the hairy snails and their allies. It is endemic to Spain.

Distribution

This snail occurs in the eastern Basque Country and in northern Navarre. It can be found in the Aizkorri and Aralar Ranges and on Lindux Mountain. It lives under rocks in dry, open habitat types. The population is thought to be stable and there are few threats.

References

 Gittenberger, E. & Manga, M. Y. (1981). A new Helicella (Helicidae, Helicellinae) from Navarra, Spain. Basteria. 45 (4/5): 121-124. Leiden. 
 Bank, R. A.; Neubert, E. (2017). Checklist of the land and freshwater Gastropoda of Europe. Last update: July 16th, 2017

Endemic molluscs of the Iberian Peninsula
Helicella
Endemic fauna of Spain
Gastropods described in 1981
Taxonomy articles created by Polbot